The Thiruppanandal block is a revenue block in the Thiruvidaimarudur taluk of the Thanjavur district in Tamil Nadu, India. It has a total of 44 panchayat villages.

List of Panchayat villages

References 

 

Revenue blocks of Thanjavur district